Ronald Knox Meridith (born November 26, 1956) is a former middle reliever in Major League Baseball who pitched from 1984 through 1987 for the Chicago Cubs and Texas Rangers. On September 9, 1985, as a member of the Cubs, Meridith recorded the final out of the game to pick up his one and only career save against the arch rival Cardinals. He saved the game for starter Ray Fontenot.  

Meridith now works as a senior mortgage consultant at First Centennial Mortgage in Irvine, California.

References

External links
, or Retrosheet
Pura Pelota

1956 births
Living people
Águilas del Zulia players
Baseball players from California
Chicago Cubs players
Columbus Astros players
Daytona Beach Astros players
Gulf Coast Astros players
Hawaii Islanders players
Iowa Cubs players
Louisville Redbirds players
Major League Baseball pitchers
Oklahoma City 89ers players
Oral Roberts Golden Eagles baseball players
Oral Roberts University alumni
People from San Pedro, Los Angeles
Texas Rangers players
Tigres de Aragua players
American expatriate baseball players in Venezuela
Toledo Mud Hens players
Tucson Toros players